Nasir Khan Musazai is a Pakistani politician who has been a member of the National Assembly of Pakistan since August 2018.

Political career
He was elected to the National Assembly of Pakistan as a candidate of Pakistan Tehreek-e-Insaf (PTI) from Constituency NA-29 (Peshawar-III) in 2018 Pakistani general election. He received 49,762 votes and defeated Mufti Naeem Jaan, a candidate of Muttahida Majlis-e-Amal (MMA).

References

Living people
Pakistani MNAs 2018–2023
Year of birth missing (living people)
Pakistan Tehreek-e-Insaf MNAs

External Link
National Assembly of Pakistan | PERSONAL PROFILE | Mr. Nasir Khan Musazai